The 2006 Japanese Grand Prix (formally known as the 2006 Formula 1 Fuji Television Japanese Grand Prix) was a Formula One race held on 8 October 2006 at the Suzuka Circuit, in Suzuka, Japan. It was the seventeenth and penultimate round of the 2006 Formula One World Championship, and marked the 32nd running of the Japanese Grand Prix. It was won by Fernando Alonso, his last win for the Renault team before he moved to McLaren the following season. It was the first Formula One race to be broadcast in HDTV by Fuji Television, and was the 20th Grand Prix to be held at Suzuka.

Report

Practice and qualifying

Friday drivers
The bottom 6 teams in the 2005 Constructors' Championship and Super Aguri were entitled to run a third car in free practice on Friday. These drivers drove on Friday but did not compete in qualifying or the race.

Race
Felipe Massa started the race from pole, but Michael Schumacher passed him on lap 3 to take the lead. Meanwhile, Alonso was struggling to get past the Toyotas of Trulli and Ralf Schumacher. By lap 10 Alonso was 5.4 seconds off the leader. On lap 15 Alonso managed to pass Massa in the pitstops and chased Schumacher. He succeeded in closing the gap from 5.4 seconds on lap 10 to 4.2 seconds by lap 27 only for it to open up to 5.9 seconds by lap 34 after the two drivers encountered backmarkers. The race was crucial in the fight for the World Championship, as whoever finished ahead of the two would take the championship lead into the final race. On lap 37, after the two rivals had made their final pitstops, Schumacher's engine failed, his first engine failure since the 2000 French Grand Prix, giving the lead to Alonso, who went on to win the race. As a result, he needed only one point from the final race to secure the title.

, Alonso's win remains the most recent victory for a car running on Michelin tyres, as the manufacturer pulled out of Formula One at the end of the season. Giancarlo Fisichella dedicated his third-place finish to his best friend, Tonino Visciani, who had died on 5 October 2006 after a heart attack.

Classification

Qualifying

Race

Championship standings after the race

Drivers' Championship standings

Constructors' Championship standings

 Note: Only the top five positions are included for both sets of standings.
 Bold text indicates competitors who still had a theoretical chance of becoming World Champion.

References

External links

 Detailed Japanese Grand Prix results (archived)

Japanese Grand Prix
Japanese Grand Prix
Grand Prix
Japanese Grand Prix